Adjectival may refer to:
 Anything related to or serving as an adjective
 Adjectival noun (Japanese)
 Adjectival demonym, an adjective used to indicate a location (e.g. Irish, Italian)
 List of adjectival and demonymic forms of place names
 List of adjectivals and demonyms for subcontinental regions
 List of adjectival and demonymic forms for countries and nations
 List of adjectivals and demonyms for cities
 List of adjectivals and demonyms of astronomical bodies
 List of adjectivals and demonyms for former regions
 List of adjectival tourisms

See also
Adjective phrase
Adjectival noun (disambiguation)